Megasecoptera is a Paleozoic insect order. There are 22 known families of megasecopterans, with about 35 known genera.

Overview
Like all other paleodictyopteroids, the megasecopterans had sucking mouthparts. The suctorial mouth parts were probably used to pierce plant casings and extract high-quality plant materials, such as spores and pollen.

Unlike some earlier insects, megasecopterans bore two pairs of wings, which were nearly of the same size. The wings probably were held horizontally, as in dragonflies (Odonata, Anisoptera). The wing bases tend to be very slender and petiolated, as in damselflies (Odonata, Zygoptera). The body was usually long and thin, although the genus Protohymen was rather stouter and shorter than a typical megasecopteran. Another distinctive feature was the presence of a number of fine processes projecting from the body, which in some cases could be longer than the body itself, forming long fringes on the insect's underside.

During their relatively brief period of existence, the Megasecoptera were rather successful. It has been estimated that this insect order accounted for 50% of the insect biomass in some locations, but the available evidence might be misleading..

References

Sources
Palaeos.com

Prehistoric insects
Extinct insect orders
Pennsylvanian first appearances
Permian extinctions
Fossil taxa described in 1885
Taxa named by Charles Jules Edmée Brongniart
Palaeodictyopteroidea